Ndukwe Dike "N. D." Kalu (born August 3, 1975) is a former American football defensive end. He was drafted by the Philadelphia Eagles in the fifth round of the 1997 NFL Draft. He played college football at Rice.

Early years
Kalu attended Pat Neff Middle School and John Marshall High School in San Antonio, Texas, graduating in 1993.

Professional career
Kalu was originally selected with the 22nd pick of the fifth round of the 1997 NFL Draft out of Rice University by the Philadelphia Eagles. He later played for the Washington Redskins, then returned to the Eagles, then finished his NFL career with the Houston Texans.

Personal life
Kalu is of Nigerian descent. He is currently working at sports radio station KBME in Houston, hosting a Houston sports show called ""In The Trenches". He also serves as an occasional analyst for CSN Houston, American Sports Network, and ESPN3.

References

External links
NFL.com bio

1975 births
Living people
Players of American football from Baltimore
American football defensive ends
Rice Owls football players
Philadelphia Eagles players
Washington Redskins players
Houston Texans players
American sportspeople of Nigerian descent